Doughboy Island may refer to:

Australia

Tasmania
 Doughboy Island (Tasmania), a small island in the Furneaux Group between Flinders Island and Barren Island in Bass Srait off northeast Tasmania
 The Doughboys (Tasmania), a pair of islands off Cape Grim, Tasmania

Victoria
 Doughboy Island (Victoria), a small island in Corner Inlet

United States
 Doughboy Island, a small island in Bluffton, South Carolina

See also
 Dough Boy (disambiguation)